The Genius of Crime is a Canadian drama film, directed by Louis Bélanger and released in 2006. An adaptation of George F. Walker's stage play Criminal Genius, the film stars Gilles Renaud as Rolly and Patrick Drolet as Stevie, two criminal hoodlums who are hired by Shirley (Anne-Marie Cadieux) to burn down the restaurant of her rival Mike (Robert Morin), only to instead end up kidnapping Amanda (Julie Le Breton), the restaurant's chef and Mike's daughter.

The film's cast also includes François Papineau as Phillie, the manager of the motel where they are hiding out.

The film premiered at the Abitibi-Témiscamingue International Film Festival on October 28, 2006.

The film received two Jutra Award nominations at the 9th Jutra Awards in 2007, for Best Costume Design (Anne Duceppe) and Best Hair (Martin Rivest).

References

External links

2006 films
2006 drama films
Canadian crime comedy-drama films
Canadian black comedy films
Films directed by Louis Bélanger
Films based on Canadian plays
Incest in film
French-language Canadian films
2000s Canadian films